The golden bamboo lemur (Hapalemur aureus),  or  in Malagasy, is a medium-sized bamboo lemur endemic to south-eastern Madagascar.

Description
The golden bamboo lemur is crepuscular i.e. is a most active at dawn and dusk.

Distribution
It is known from the vicinity of Ranomafana National Park (first discovery in 1986 by Patricia Wright), Andringitra National Park (discovered in 1993), possibly in a forest corridor that connects Ranomafana with Andringitra National Park.

Ecology
As its name indicates, this lemur feeds almost exclusively on grasses, especially the giant bamboo or volohosy (Cathariostachys madagascariensis) feeding on new shoots, leaf bases and the creepers. The growing shoots of this bamboo contain 0.015% (1 part in 6667) of cyanide.

Females have a gestation period of approximately 138 days and give birth to one infant (occasionally two) at the beginning of the rainy season, in November or December. The young are highly dependent on their mothers and are kept hidden in dense vegetation for the first two weeks.

Conservation
The golden bamboo lemur was discovered in 1986 by Dr. Patricia Wright, in what is now Ranomafana National Park. The park was opened in 1991 to protect this endangered lemur, as well as several other lemur species and its flora and fauna. The population is declining, predominantly due to hunting and to ongoing habitat loss; with only about 1,000 individuals remaining. The principal loss of habitat is due to slash-and-burn agriculture or the harvesting of bamboo, for use as a building material as well as for carrying water and basket making. The species is classified as critically endangered by the International Union for Conservation of Nature (IUCN) and is listed on Appendix I of CITES, CITES (the Convention on International Trade in Endangered Species of Wild Fauna and Flora, also known as the Washington Convention).

References

External links
 

Bamboo lemurs
Endemic fauna of Madagascar
Mammals of Madagascar
Critically endangered fauna of Africa
Mammals described in 1987
EDGE species
Fauna of the Madagascar lowland forests
Fauna of the Madagascar subhumid forests